The New Democratic Party of Ontario is one of three major political parties in Ontario, Canada. It governed the province from 1990 to 1995, and is currently the third-largest party in the Legislative Assembly of Ontario.

The NDP led at the time by Howard Hampton ran a full state of 103 candidates in the 2003 Ontario provincial election, seven of whom were elected. Three more candidates were elected in by-elections held in 2004, March 2006 and February 2007. Several NDP candidates have their own biography pages. Information about other candidates may be found here.

Candidates

By-elections

Notes

2003